Simone Marie Wilson (born 20 February 1976) is an Australian politician. She was the Liberal National Party member for Pumicestone in the Queensland Legislative Assembly from 2017 to 2020.

Following her entrance to state parliament, Wilson supported Deb Frecklington in her successful bid to become leader of the LNP and therefore the Opposition. Wilson then joined the LNP front bench as Shadow Assistant Minister for Education, assisting Jarrod Bleijie.

In September 2019 Wilson announced that she would not stand as a candidate at the October 2020 state election.

References

External links
Parliamentary Profile

1976 births
Living people
Members of the Queensland Legislative Assembly
Liberal National Party of Queensland politicians
Women members of the Queensland Legislative Assembly
21st-century Australian women politicians